Dente is a surname. Notable people with the surname include:

Fernando Dente (born 1990), Argentine actor, singer, dancer, theater director, and TV presenter
Marco Dente (1493–1527), Italian Renaissance engraver
Piero Dente (1901–?), Italian soldier and skier, competitor at the 1924 Winter Olympics (military patrol)
Sam Dente (1922–2002), American baseball player

See also
Al dente